Scarus forsteni, commonly known as the whitespot parrotfish, or Forsten's parrotfish, is a marine fish native to tropical areas in the western Pacific Ocean, where it lives in coral reefs and feeds on benthic algae.

References

External links
 

forsteni
Fish of Australia
Taxa named by Pieter Bleeker
Fish described in 1861
Fish of the Pacific Ocean